is a former Japanese football player and manager.

Club career
Taguchi was born in Saitama on September 14, 1965. After graduating from University of Tsukuba, he joined All Nippon Airways (later Yokohama Flügels) in 1989. He became a regular player as center back from first season. However he was suspended for seven months from October 1991 due to violence against referee. In 1993, he moved to Sanfrecce Hiroshima. However he could not become regular player due to injury before opening season. In 1994, he moved to his local club Urawa Reds and became a regular player. However he was suspended for four months from September 1995 due to violence against supporter after a match. From 1997, he could hardly play in the match in two seasons for injury. Although he came back on October 3, 1998, he receiving a red card. This match became his last match. He retired end of 1998 season.

National team career
In 1988, when Taguchi was a University of Tsukuba student, he was selected Japan national "B team" for 1988 Asian Cup. At this competition, he played 3 games. However, Japan Football Association don't count as Japan national team match because this Japan team was "B team" not "top team"

Coaching career
After retirement, Taguchi became a manager for L.League club Urawa Reinas (later Saitama Reinas) in 2001. In 2004, the club won the champions L.League and the 2nd place Empress's Cup. He resigned end of 2004 season.

Club statistics

References

External links

 

1965 births
Living people
University of Tsukuba alumni
Association football people from Saitama Prefecture
Japanese footballers
Japan Soccer League players
J1 League players
Yokohama Flügels players
Sanfrecce Hiroshima players
Urawa Red Diamonds players
Japanese football managers
1988 AFC Asian Cup players
Footballers at the 1990 Asian Games
Association football defenders
Asian Games competitors for Japan
Japanese sportsperson-politicians